Alfred Charles Pinkston (October 22, 1917 – March 18, 1981) was an American Negro league and Mexican League baseball player.

Life and career
A native of Newbern, Alabama, Pinkston played one game for the Cleveland Buckeyes of the Negro leagues in 1948. He played in the Provincial League in the early 1950s and won the league's triple crown in 1952 for the St. Hyacinthe A's. Pinkston went on to play minor league baseball for such clubs as the Ottawa Athletics, Columbus Jets and Amarillo Gold Sox, and spent several years in the Mexican League into the mid-1960s, eventually earning induction into the Mexican Professional Baseball Hall of Fame in 1974.

On June 27, 1962, his son, Adrián Chávez, was born. At some point after his birth, Pinkston wanted to take Chávez with him back to the U.S., but his mother wouldn't allow it, going as far as changing Chávez's name to prevent him from doing so. Chávez would go on to become a professional soccer player, representing Mexico in the 1994 FIFA World Cup.

Pinkston died in Fort Wayne, Indiana in 1981 at age 63.

References

Further reading
 Afro-American staff (April 9, 1955). "Long jump to majors fails to dim Pinkston's hopes; Thumbnail sketches on 5 Athletics". The Afro-American. p. 17 
 Tribune staff (June 11, 1960). "Al Pinkston Sets Sight on Josh Gibson's Homer Record". The Philadelphia Tribune. p. 12
 Heiling, Joe (July 7, 1960). "Looking 'Em Over: Al Pinkston's the Talk of Mexico". The Austin Statesman. p. A20

External links
 and Seamheads
 Alfred 'Al' Pinkston at Negro League Baseball Players Association

1917 births
1981 deaths
Cleveland Buckeyes players
Diablos Rojos del México players
Mexican Baseball Hall of Fame inductees
American expatriate baseball players in Mexico
American expatriate baseball players in Canada
Amarillo Gold Sox players
Columbia Gems players
Columbus Jets players
Farnham Pirates players
Jacksonville Braves players
Ottawa A's players
Rojos del Águila de Veracruz players
Savannah A's players
St. Hyacinthe A's players
Williamsport A's players
20th-century African-American sportspeople